Bruno Arpaia, born in Naples (Italy) in 1957, is an Italian writer and journalist.

Life
After his degree in political sciences and a specialisation in American history at the University of Naples, he taught there and then became a journalist with the Italian newspaper Il Mattino of Naples, subsequently moving to Milan in 1989, where he worked for the daily La Repubblica.

In 1990 he published his first novel, I forestieri (The Foreigners), which won the Bagutta Prize the following year. Arpaia published another three novels, after leaving the newspaper La Repubblica in 1998, in order to dedicate himself solely to writing and freelance journalism.

L'Angelo della storia (Guanda, 2001) is his most successful novel, also being selected for the prestigious Campiello Prize in 2001. Translated into English in 2006 with the title The Angel of History by Minna Proctor, under the patronage of the Scottish Arts Council and the Italian Cultural Institute, it tells the partly fictional story of philosopher Walter Benjamin and a young Spanish militant in 1940. Arpaia's twofold narrative retraces Benjamin's flight across Europe and the Spaniard's youthful activism, as both men battle to assert their beliefs in the face of ultimate extinction.

Arpaia lives in Milan and currently alternates between translation, journalism and writing novels. He is also a publishing consultant for several Italian newspapers and publishing houses.

Bibliography 

  I forestieri, Leonardo Editore, 1990.
  Il futuro in punta di piedi, Donzelli, 1994.
  Tempo perso, Marco Tropea editore, 1997; Guanda, 2003.
  L'Angelo della storia, Guanda, 2001.
  The Angel of History, Canongate, 2006
  Il passato davanti a noi, Guanda, 2006.
  Per una sinistra reazionaria, Guanda, 2007.
  L'energia del vuoto, Guanda, 2011.
  Qualcosa, là fuori, Guanda, 2016.

References

External links
"The Angel of History by Bruno Arpaia", Three Monkeys online, Steve Porter

Journalists from Naples
Italian male journalists
Living people
1957 births
Writers from Naples
University of Naples Federico II alumni